Lubraniec  is a town in Włocławek County, Kuyavian-Pomeranian Voivodeship, Poland, with 3,235 inhabitants (2004).
Lubraniec is a sister city with the Dutch Winsum.

Cities and towns in Kuyavian-Pomeranian Voivodeship
Włocławek County